Overgaden Neden Vandet 33 is a residential property in the Christianshavn neighborhood of central Copenhagen, Denmark. It is one of three properties along with Christianshavn Canal that were built by anchor smith Hans Caspersen and are now known as the Hans Caspersen House, the other being Overgaden Oven Vandet 50 and Overgaden Neden Vandet 33. The building at Sankt Annæ Gade 4 is also associated with Caspersen. The building was listed on the Danish registry of protected buildings and places in 1918.

History

The brewery
Until 1688, the property was owned by brewer Jens Bjørnsen, later being bought by Berndt Jensen who owned it from 1717-1738. In a fire insurance policy from 1838, it is described as a two-storey half-timbered building, 10 bays wide towards the street and with gate and wall dormer. A 10-bay, two storey half-timbered side wing, with shed roof extended from the rear side of the building. The two buildings were connected by a 1.9 m wide, half-timbered staircase building. A free-standing, 8-bay, two-storey outbuilding with a shed roof and a water pump were also located in the courtyard.

Court baker Jochum Lentz (1690-1740) and his wife Marie Sophie Jensdatter (1689-1729) acquired the property in 1738. After Lentz' death in 1740, the property was sold to Christen Larsen Døstrup, a brewer and distiller, who shortly thereafter sold it to the Copenhagen Brewers' Guild.

Terchel Hansen Leye's house and workshop
 
The property was acquired by master cooper Terchel Hansen Leye (1703-1760) in 1745. He undertook a comprehensive renovation of the complex. In a fire insurance policy from 1747, it is described as a 7-bay, two storey brick building with wall dormer. The roof was clad with glazed tiles and topped by a gilded Weather vane. The facade was decorated with stone portals around the gate and pilasters topped by sandstone capitals.

Hans Caspersen
The property was acquired by anchor smith Hans Caspersen in 1782. He heightened the building with three floors in 1782-83.

19th century

In 1797, Caspersen sold the property to master ship builder Jørgen Hansen Koch (1745-1801) and his wife Anne Cathrine Volkersen (1758-1809). Their son was the later architect and court master builder Jørgen Hansen Koch (1787-1860). The property was listed as No. 157 in the new cadastre of 1806.

The property was home to 32 residents in three households at the 1840 census. Hans Christian Ley, a master tailor, resided on the first floor with his wife Johanne Marie Ley, their four children (aged 22 to 34), two brothers-in-laws, four sisters-in-law, a nephew and a maid.  Carl Wilhelm Wiehe (1788-1867), secretary in the Kommercekollegiet, resided on the second floor with his wife Antoinette Liuise Wiehe, their four children (aged 10 tp 20), acting student August Eduard Hansen (1820-1874) and one maid. The eldest son was the actor . Niels Brock Perch, a tea merchant, resided on the third floor with his wife Axeline Kirstine Henriette Holm, their five children (aged 12 to 27), his sister	Helene Perch, one male servant and one maid. The actor Mikael Wiehe (1820-1864) was still a resident of the building in 1843-1844.

The property was home to 38 residents at the 1860 census. Ludvig Johansen Vetterslev, a workman, resided on the ground floor with his wife Andrea Hanne f. Andresen and their two-year-old son.	 Johan Christian Jacobsen, a merchant trading on Iceland, resided on the first floor with his wife Dorthea Frederikke f. Kinding, their four children (aged two to 17), two sisters-in-laws, an apprentice and two maids. Mathias Lumholtz, an officer in the Royal Artillery Brigade with rank of major, resided in the building with his wife Anna Elisabeth (née Arntz), their five children (aged 19 to 24), one lodger and one maid.	 Carl Edouard Meldahl, another military officer with rank of second lieutenant, resided in the building with his wife Anine Pauline f. Kahn, their one-year-old son, 22-year-old Louise Kahn	/father dead) and two maids. Rasmus Hansen, a former distiller, resided in the building with his wife Karen Marie Scholdborg	and one maid.

The actor Emil Poulsen (1842-1911) was a resident of the building in 1869-71. The actor Olaf Poulsen (1849-1923) resided on the third floor in 1869-71.

The property was home to 35 residents at the 1880 census. Haagen Hagen, a bookkeeper, resided on the ground floor with his wife Johanne Mathilde Hagen and one maid. Frederik Villiam Andersen, a businessman (grosserer), resided on the first floor with his wife Eleonore Caroline Andersen, their six children (aged four to nine), one male servant and three maids. Johan Lorenz Clemensen, a chief physician, resided on the second floor with his wife Ida Cathrine Clemensen, their daughter Amalie Clemensen, their foster daughter Frederikke Faber and one maid.	 Albert Olaf Eduard Gertner, a 22-year-old gardening student, was also resident on the second floor. Carl Vigand Lose, a cassier, resided on the third floor with his wife Henriette Debora Losem, their one-year-old son and two maids. Hans Peter Andersen, the proprietor of a tavern in the basement, resided in the associated dwelling with his wife Josephine Charlotte Andersen.

Architecture
 
The building is seven bays wide. The facade is decorated with pilasters. The gate is topped by a fanlight and the keystone features a relief of a seashell.

Today
The property was owned by Steen Olaf Toftebjerg in 2008.

List of owners
 – 1689 Jens Biørnsen
 1717-1738 Berndt Jensen
 1738-1740 Jochum Lentz
 1740-1741 Christen Larsen Døstrup
 1741-1745 Copenhagen Brewers' Guild
 1745-1762 Terchel Hansen Leye / Mette Pederdatter
 1762-1782 Dorothea Marie Terchelsdatter Reinholtz
 1782-1797 Hans Caspersen
 1797-1807 Jørgen Hansen Koch / Anne Cathrine Volkersen

References

External links

Buildings and structures in Christianshavn
Listed residential buildings in Copenhagen
Buildings and structures completed in 1783